This is a list of the Sites of Special Scientific Interest (SSSIs) in the Neath Port Talbot Area of Search (AoS).

Sites

References

Neath Port Talbot
Neath Port Talbot